Paulo Jesus Navalho (24 December 1966 – 23 August 1987) was a professional footballer. Born in Angola, Navalho represented Portugal at youth international level. He died after suffering an acute myocardial infarction during a friendly game against Al Jazira Club of the United Arab Emirates.

Career statistics

Club

References

1966 births
1987 deaths
Portuguese footballers
Portugal youth international footballers
Association football forwards
Liga Portugal 2 players
Sporting CP footballers
Clube Oriental de Lisboa players
S.L. Benfica footballers
Atlético Clube de Portugal players
Association football players who died while playing
Sport deaths in Portugal